RazorThreat is an American software company that develops advanced threat protection software that detects unknown and unauthorized activity occurring in a network. Its Threat Analysis Console was listed in 2007 as an "industry innovator" by Secure Computing.

Company history
 2006 - RazorThreat founded by Greg Guidice and headquartered in Royal Oak, Michigan, United States.
 2007 - RazorThreat TAC introduced
 2009 - RazorThreat relocates headquarters to Pontiac, Michigan
 2010 - RazorDetect introduced
 2011 - RazorThreat Vision introduced
 2013 - RazorThreat HVA introduced

In September 2012, RazorThreat partnered with Ficus Consulting Group of Westborough, MA to resell its RazorThreat Vision threat intelligence software.

Products 
RazorThreat Vision provides post-filter analysis of log, flow and vulnerability data detecting targeted, customized, botnets, advanced persistent threat (APT)and other modern malware providing positive control over what is happening within a network. RazorThreat Vision provides visibility into known and unknown, authorized and unauthorized, external and internal network activity. RazorThreat Vision detects, identifies and alerts on potential threats then provides information to re-arm event driven security products like firewalls, intrusion detection systems, intrusion prevention systems, security information and event management systems.

RazorDetect is an appliance-based bot, malware and insider threat detection solution for small to medium-sized businesses. It provides a graphical display of threats to the network delivering a personalized threat index. RazorDetect is ideally suited to be delivered as a managed security service or software as a service.

RazorThreat HVA provides specific focus on the monitoring of High Value Assets. RazorThreat HVA detects unauthorized and unknown access to those digital assets that are of the highest value. RazorThreat HVA will track and monitor all activity to and from the high-value assets including access by malicious entities from “outside” the organization to trusted “insiders” who are authorized to be on the network but not necessarily authorized to access a particular high-value asset.

Managed Security Services RazorThreat’s Managed Security Service consists of a simple three step process. 
Step One is the identification of critical information assets as well who is authorized to access them establishing positive control of your network activity. Step Two is the discovery of current security devices and the collection and analysis of security logs and network flow data. Step Three is a periodic interactive meeting with your network professionals to review any unknown or unauthorized activity and determine how the activity should be addressed.

References 

 SC Magazine First Look
 SC Magazine Industry Innovators NitroSecurity
 RazorThreat Emerging Technology Company of the Year
 451 Research Review of Threat Stream

External links 
Corporate website

Software companies based in Michigan
Defunct software companies of the United States